Delta High School, is a public high school located northeast of Muncie, Indiana. The school serves about 800 students in grades 9 to 12. The towns of Eaton, Albany, DeSoto, and Royerton are also serviced by Delta High School.

History
Delta High School was created in June 1967 when DeSoto, Eaton, and Royerton High Schools consolidated to form Delaware Metropolitan School District.

A committee of students from each school met to decide the school's name, colors, mascot, and to write the school's song.

Several names were discussed, including Nor-Del, Grissom, and Apollo. Nor-Del was rejected because there already was a Wes-Del nearby. Grissom, in honor of Hoosier astronaut Gus Grissom who had died in a fire, was given strong consideration, but the committee then learned there already was another Grissom in Indiana. Apollo was another idea to honor the burgeoning space program.

One of the 24 committee members, Dale DeHaven, a freshman from DeSoto, then suggested Delta. DeHaven said he came up with Delta by playing around with letters that were common to the three consolidating schools, Eaton, DeSoto, Royerton, and the word Delaware.

The Eagle mascot was also chosen following the Greek motif by choosing Zeus's symbol
of power and strength. Navy blue and gold were chosen for the school colors. An original school song written by Mary Jolliffe Kraack, 1968, was selected by the committee.

Albany High School joined the Delaware Metropolitan School District in 1968 and the school district's name was changed to Delaware Community School Corporation.

In 1968, the DARE Eagle was designed and became the official mascot for Delta because the students of Delta High School DARE to be outstanding in all areas. The letters in the word DARE were from the first letter in each of the four consolidated schools. D for DeSoto, A for Albany, R for Royerton, and E for Eaton.

The ground was broken for the new school building in March 1972. In September 1974 the new Delta High School was opened.
 
Delta High School was remodeled in 1992. It was once again remodeled in 2007 due to a mold problem. It also had many structural issues (leaks in the ceilings, etc.) and mold problems circa 2004-2007, but recent remodeling has hopefully helped to remedy this issue.

As of 2012 the principal is Chris Conley.

On May 18, 2019, Vice President Mike Pence delivered a speech at the school.

Competitions won
1981–1985 Wrestling team state champions
1995–2009 Fifteen consecutive regional boys tennis championships
1997 State Runner-up in single-class basketball
2001, 2002, and 2009 Class 3A state volleyball champions
2001 Class 4A state football runner-up
2002 3A state champions in basketball
2005 Winner of Milken Educator Award, Lance Brand
2009 National Volleyball Player of the Year Darcy Dorton
2009 Class 3A Final Four Team in basketball
2009 State runner-Up Interpretive Dance Squad
2009 Academic Team runner-up of 16 schools in Ball State's Cardinal Quiz Bowl
Three-time state title holder in 100-meter dash, Christina Poulson
42 All-State players in boys and girls tennis
Technology Engineering Program - Project Lead the Way

Athletics
Delta High School is a member of the IHSAA. The school's mascot is the Eagle and the school's colors are Navy Blue, Gold, and White. Delta High School is part of the Hoosier Heritage Conference. Their rival is the Yorktown Tigers located in nearby Yorktown,

Extracurricular activities

Agriculture Department
Delta High School is the only school that has an agriculture department in Delaware County. More than 200 students participate. It includes classes such as greenhouse, agricultural mechanics, animal science, landscaping, natural resources, small engines, and welding. Agriculture Department teacher Nancy Kunk co-sponsors the FFA, which involves about 69 students. These students participate in National FFA week petting zoo, county fair young McDonald's Farm, Adopt a Highway, and the Albany Halloween parade. FFA members also participate in contests such as soil judging, small engines, welding, horse and pony, crops, forestry, landscaping, mechanics, livestock, and dairy.

The Ag Department provides opportunities for students who want to be in agriculture-related careers the experience they need to go to college and other places. The department maintains its own greenhouse, which helps with the flowers and landscaping of the school.

Student publications

The Eagle's Eye newsmagazine is the Delta High School newspaper. It has a full-color cover and 28+ pages, including sections of color. The magazine includes stories on students and about topics that appeal to students. The staff makes 5 to 6 magazines a year. Delta is one of the only schools in East Central Indiana to produce a magazine. The Eagle's Eye staff also often writes the news for the school's webpage.

WWDS was the name of the former radio station of Delta High School. It is now the name used by the television news crew that writes, produces, and performs its own news cast for the daily announcements. The production group that works inside the studio is known as the Eagle Zone News team.

Notable alumni
Matt Painter - Varsity basketball player, assistant coach, and, later, head coach at Purdue University.

See also
 List of high schools in Indiana

References

External links
Delta High School website

Educational institutions established in 1967
Public high schools in Indiana
Buildings and structures in Muncie, Indiana
Schools in Delaware County, Indiana
Education in Muncie, Indiana
1967 establishments in Indiana